Ian Noel Carter (born 20 September 1967) is a Canadian former soccer player who played at both professional and international levels.

Early and personal life
Born in Birmingham, England, Carter grew up in the Canadian city of Mississauga.

Career

Club career
Carter made his professional debut in 1987 with Toronto Italia, and also played for Winnipeg Fury, Toronto Blizzard, Peterborough United, Dover Athletic, Montreal Impact, Toronto Lynx and Harrisburg City Islanders.

In 1998, he signed with the newly expansion franchise the Toronto Olympians  in the newly formed Canadian Professional Soccer League. Throughout the 1998 CPSL season, Carter achieved an undefeated streak with the Olympians the first club within the league to achieve this milestone. As well as winning the winning the regular season and the Open Canada Cup. The club reached the playoff finals but were defeated by the St. Catharines Wolves by 4–2 defeat in a penalty shootout.

International career
Carter was part of the Canadian youth squad at the 1987 FIFA World Youth Championship in Chile. He also was on the Canadian team at the 1987 Pan American Games.

He earned a total of 8 caps for the Canadian senior team.

References

External links 
 

1967 births
Living people
Naturalized citizens of Canada
English emigrants to Canada
Soccer players from Mississauga
Footballers from Birmingham, West Midlands
Black Canadian soccer players
Canadian expatriate sportspeople in England
Canadian soccer players
Association football defenders
Toronto Italia players
Winnipeg Fury players
Toronto Blizzard (1986–1993) players
Peterborough United F.C. players
Dover Athletic F.C. players
Montreal Impact (1992–2011) players
Toronto Lynx players
Toronto (Mississauga) Olympians players
Penn FC players
Canadian Soccer League (1987–1992) players
American Professional Soccer League players
Canadian Soccer League (1998–present) players
English Football League players
Canadian National Soccer League players
Canada men's youth international soccer players
Pan American Games competitors for Canada
Footballers at the 1987 Pan American Games
Canada men's international soccer players
1996 CONCACAF Gold Cup players
Canadian expatriate soccer players
Canadian expatriate sportspeople in the United States
Expatriate footballers in England
Expatriate soccer players in the United States
North York Rockets players